Donna Kay Martell (December 24, 1927-) was an American actress who starred in film and television during the Golden Age Era in the 1950s and 1960s.

Early years
Born on December 24, 1927, in Los Angeles, California, to Louis and Margaret de Maria, Martell was active in athletics in high school and attended Los Angeles City College.

Career 
Martell began her film career in 1947 when she was cast in the Republic Pictures western Apache Rose, starring Roy Rogers and Dale Evans. She continued making appearances throughout the late 1940s, signing a contract with Universal Studios. In 1951, Columbia Pictures signed her to play the female lead opposite Gene Autry in Hills of Utah.

By the time the 1950s arrived, Martell's career shifted towards television. She portrayed Marie DiPaolo in The Bob Cummings Show and appeared in shows such as Shotgun Slade, Cavalcade of America, The Range Rider, Bat Masterson and Cheyenne.

She was also in Project Moonbase (also known as Project Moon Base), a 1953 black-and-white science-fiction film directed by Richard Talmadge. The film is unusual for its time in both attempting to portray space travel in a "realistic" manner, and for depicting a future in which women hold positions of authority and responsibility equal to men; in the script Martell's character, Briteis (pronounced bright-eyes), is a colonel that has made the first orbital flight around the Earth four years earlier and outranks her fellow male astronaut, who is a major. Colonel Briteis' given name is never stated.

Donna Martell's acting career officially ended in 1963; but made a brief comeback in the 1983 TV movie Grace Kelly, playing the part of Mrs. Edie Austin, a friend of the Kelly family who, along with her husband Russell Austin, was instrumental in advancing the real-life relationship between Grace Kelly and Prince Rainier III of Monaco.
Donna Martell appeared in a television episode of Hopalong Cassidy as a Mexican sister trying to save her wrongfully accused brother.

Awards
She was presented one of the 2002 Golden Boot Awards for her contributions to western television and cinema.

Personal life
Martell married professional baseball player Gene Edgar Corso on June 27, 1953. The couple had three children. Corso pre-deceased his wife in 1996.

Filmography
{|class="wikitable"
|-
!Year
!Title
!Role
!Notes
|-
|rowspan=5|1947
|Apache Rose
|Rosa Vega
|
|-
|Twilight on the Rio Grande
|1st telephone operator
|Uncredited
|-
|Robin Hood of Monterey
|Lolita
|
|-
|The Lost Moment
|Pretty Girl
|Uncredited
|-
|Secret Beyond the Door
|Young Mexican girl
|Uncredited
|-
|rowspan=3|1948
|The Woman from Tangier
|Flo-Flo
|
|-
|The Saxon Charm
|Flower girl
|Uncredited
|-
|Mexican Hayride
|Girl
|Uncredited
|-
|rowspan=2|1949
|Illegal Entry
|Maria
|
|-
|Abbott and Costello Meet the Killer, Boris Karloff
|Betty Crandall
|
|-
|rowspan=3|1950
|I Was a Shoplifter
|Sales clerk
|Uncredited
|-
|Peggy
|Contestant
|
|-
|Kim
|Haikun
|Uncredited
|-
|rowspan=2|1951
|The Hills of Utah|Nola French
|
|-
|Elephant Stampede|Lola
|
|-
|rowspan=2|1952
|Last Train from Bombay|Nawob's daughter
|
|-
|The Golden Hawk|Emilie Savonez
|
|-
|rowspan=2|1953
|Project Moonbase|Colonel Briteis
|
|-
|Give a Girl a Break|Janet Hallson
|
|-
|1954
|The Egyptian|Lady in waiting
|Uncredited
|-
|rowspan=3|1955
|Ten Wanted Men|Maria Segura
|
|-
|Love Is a Many-Splendored Thing|Suchen
|
|-
|Last of the Desperados|Felice
|
|-
|rowspan=2|1957
|Hell on Devil's Island|Giselle Renault
|
|-
|House of Numbers|Lois
|Uncredited
|-
|}

TelevisionThe Adventures of Kit Carson (1952-1953) five characters in seven episodesDeath Valley Days (1952) "She Burns Green" - Rosie Winters; (1955) "The Valencia Cake" - Charlita The Lineup (1955) "Girl Safecrackers"The West Point Story (1957) two different episodesThe Lineup (1958) "The Pawn Ticket Case"Cheyenne (1960) as Maria, in television episode "Home Is the Brave" - Maria Prescott77 Sunset Strip (1961) "Hot Tomale Caper", Two-part episode - Maria RodriguezTales of Wells Fargo (1961, Episode: "John Jones") - Zita LopezHawaiian Eye (1962) "Pursuit of a Lady - Maria OrelloBonanza'' (1963) "Toy Soldier" Esther Callahan

References

External links
 

1927 births
Possibly living people
American film actresses
American television actresses
Actresses from Los Angeles
20th-century American actresses
Western (genre) film actresses
Los Angeles City College alumni